Ruth Wainright can refer to:
 Ruth Symes, British children's author
 Ruth Salter Wainwright (1902-1984), Canadian artist